Only one of the two Vermont incumbents was re-elected.

Vermont law required a majority for election to Congress, with a second election to be held if the first did not return a majority. Run-off elections were required in both districts.

See also 
 List of United States representatives from Vermont
 United States House of Representatives elections, 1794 and 1795

References 

United States House of Representatives elections in Vermont
Vermont
United States House of Representatives
Vermont
United States House of Representatives